The Singiwala are a Muslim community, found in the state of Rajasthan in India. They also known as Jheewar Bangalee. Many members of Singiwala community have migrated to Pakistan after independence have settled in Karachi, Sindh.

History and origin 

The name Singiwala is derived from a combination of two Hindi words, the singi which refers to a conical brass pipe with a wide mouth and wala which means holder. The Singi pipe is used to suck impure blood from wounds. They are divided into twelve and half exogamous clans, the main ones being the Sauda, Nakpulla, Pardesi, Dilwali, Savara, Kalandar, Gyarah Donbde, Teli, Mewadi and Radi. All the clans have equal status, and there is no concept of hypergamy. A section of the Singiwala emigrated to Haryana in the 18th century and now form a distinct community known as Singikat.

Present circumstances 

The community is now found mainly in the districts of Kota district, Jaipur, Tonk. Udaipur, Sawai Madhopur and Ganganagar. They speak Hindi, and have an understanding of Rajasthani.

The Singiwala are the traditional surgeons for treating wounds, pains and psoriasis eczema. They are an extremely marginal community, and are mostly illiterate.

See also 

 Dalit
 List of Scheduled castes in Rajasthan

References 

Dalit Muslim
Social groups of Rajasthan
Dalit communities
Muslim communities of India
Social groups of Pakistan
Muslim communities of Rajasthan